Yevgeny Robertovich Urlashov was mayor of the city of Yaroslavl, Russia, from April 2012 to July 2013.

Biography
Urlashov was born on 16 July 1967 in Yaroslavl. From 1985 until 1987 he served in a fire-fighting unit of the Soviet Army.

In 1998 Urlashov graduated from the law faculty of Yaroslavl Demidov State University with a degree in jurisprudence. He began his career at Krasny Mayak factory in 1985.
During 2008–2011 he was a member of United Russia political party.

On 1 April 2012 Urlashov was elected Mayor of Yaroslavl, running as an independent candidate. He took office on 11 April 2012.

On 3 July 2013 Urlashov was detained by police on charges of bribery extortion. On 18 July he was suspended from his post pending the conclusion of the court case. He maintains that the corruption case against him was trumped up to end his political career. Urlashov was officially removed from office on 20 January 2017, when his -year sentence came into effect. He is expected to be released in the mid-2020s.

References 

1967 births
Living people
People from Yaroslavl
United Russia politicians
21st-century Russian politicians
Civic Platform (Russia) politicians
Mayors of places in Russia